Svanevatn (Norwegian for "Swan Lake"; , "Strait Lake") is a lake on the border between Norway and Russia. The Norwegian branch is situated in Sør-Varanger municipality in Troms og Finnmark county.

Lakes of Murmansk Oblast
Norway–Russia border
International lakes of Europe
Lakes of Troms og Finnmark